Miroslav Nekola (born 1 December 1947) is a Czech volleyball player and coach. He competed at the 1972 Summer Olympics and the 1976 Summer Olympics. Between 1985–1987, he was an assistant coach of the Czechoslovakia men's national volleyball team which won a silver medal at the 1985 Men's European Volleyball Championship; between 1996–1998 he was the main coach of the Czech Republic men's national volleyball team. His son Michal Nekola is a volleyball player and coach as well.

References

1947 births
Living people
Czech men's volleyball players
Olympic volleyball players of Czechoslovakia
Volleyball players at the 1972 Summer Olympics
Volleyball players at the 1976 Summer Olympics
Sportspeople from Prague